The R774 road is a regional road in County Wicklow, Ireland, which has been named the Farenkelly Road. It is a  dual-carriageway that connects the town of Greystones with the N11 national primary road at J11.

The road crosses the R761 at a roundabout near Eden Gate and terminates at the R762 north of Charlesland, Greystones.

It was completed in 2004 but not connected to the N11 until June 2006, via a temporary  "left-in, left-out" junction. The construction of a full grade interchange between the R774 and N11 was delayed when an illegal dump was unearthed at the original location for the junction.

Construction of the permanent fully grade-separated junction (J11 on the N11) started in October 2006 and was completed in 2008. 

A distinctive feature of this road is the pink central barrier (see thumbnail); it may be the only coloured barrier in Ireland.

See also
Roads in Ireland
National primary road
National secondary road

References
Roads Act 1993 (Classification of Regional Roads) Order 2006 – Department of Transport

Regional roads in the Republic of Ireland
Roads in County Wicklow